The City of Monash is a local government area in Melbourne, Victoria, Australia in the south-eastern suburbs of Melbourne with an area of 81.5 square kilometres and a population of 200,077 people in 2016.

Demographics
Monash has a diverse population, with 45% of its residents born overseas (compared to 29.0% across Melbourne), coming from more than 30 countries, with significant Chinese, UK, Greek, Indian, Malaysian and Sri Lankan populations. 42.4% of residents own their own home outright, compared to 33.1% in Melbourne, and 37.3% across Australia. The city is well educated, with 25.1% having a bachelor or higher degree (compared to 19.6% across Melbourne.

History

The City of Monash was once hunting grounds for the Bunurong people. The City of Monash, named after World War I commander Sir John Monash and the local Monash University (established 1958), was created on 15 December 1994 when the state government amalgamated local councils all over Victoria, merging a substantial portion of the former City of Oakleigh with the whole of the former City of Waverley.

Townships and localities
The 2021 census, the city had a population of 190,397 up from 182,618 in the 2016 census

^ - Territory divided with another LGA

Mayors

Councillors

Current

Single-member wards, 2000-2005

Multi-member wards, 2005-2024 

CB = Countback after previous Councillor retired or died

Schools

State 
There are 27 primary and 9 secondary state-based schools in the city of Monash.
Ashwood High School
 Brentwood Secondary College
 Glen Waverley Secondary College
 Highvale Secondary College
 John Monash Science School
 Monash Tech School
 Mount Waverley Secondary College
 South Oakleigh Secondary College
 Wellington Secondary College
 Wheelers Hill Secondary College

Private
 Avila College
 Caulfield Grammar School – Wheelers Hill Campus
 Huntingtower School
 Mazenod College
 Oakleigh Grammar
 Sacred Heart Girls' College
 Salesian College
 Wesley College – Glen Waverley Campus

Monash Gallery of Art

The premier cultural facility of the City of Monash is the Monash Gallery of Art (MGA), located at 860 Ferntree Gully Road, Wheelers Hill. MGA is the Australian home of photography and a leading public gallery. MGA collects, preserves, presents and interprets Australian Photography, providing cultural enrichment to its audiences through innovative engagement, exhibition and education programs. MGA's collection features over 2,500 photographs reflecting the history and development of Australian photographic practice from the 19th century to today. The collection is diverse and includes many iconic images and the work of photographers recognised as nationally significant.

Speak the Wind, an exhibition of photographs by Hoda Afshar, takes place from 29 April to 22 May 2022, as one of a series of official exhibitions of PHOTO 2022: International Festival of Photography, taking place in Melbourne and regional Victoria. Afshar published a book of the same name in 2021, which includes an essay by Michael Taussig and documents the landscapes and people of the islands of Hormuz, Qeshm, and Hengam, in the Persian Gulf off the south coast of Iran.

Sporting Teams

Soccer 

 Oakleigh Cannons
 Monash City FC
 Mount Waverley Soccer Club
 Monash University Football Club
 Eastern Lions SC
 Brandon Park SC
 Glen Waverley SC

Australian Rules 

 Oakleigh Chargers
 Chadstone Football Club
 Waverley Blues
 Waverley Park Hawks JFC
 Ajax Football Club

Netball 
Waverley Netball

Public Libraries
 Monash Public Library Service provides library service through six branch libraries: Clayton, Glen Waverley, Mount Waverley, Mulgrave, Oakleigh and Wheelers Hill, as well as a Home Library Service.

References

External links 
 
 Monash City Council
 Victorian Councils Guide entry for the City of Monash
 Metlink local public transport map
 Link to Land Victoria interactive maps
 Waverley Hockey Club
 Monash Gallery of Art
 Monash Public Library Service

Local government areas of Melbourne
Greater Melbourne (region)